"Pine Tree, Pine over Me" is a popular song written by Roy Jordan, Sid Bass, and Jimmy Brewster. It was published in 1953.

The best-selling version in the United States was a recording by Johnny Desmond, Eileen Barton, and The McGuire Sisters on Coral Records (catalog number 61126). The song spent one week on the Cash Box magazine Best-Selling Records chart, at #27 on March 13, 1954. The flip side was "Cling to Me."

The best-selling version in the United Kingdom was a duet by Dickie Valentine and Joan Regan.

Recorded versions
 Molly Bee
 Johnny Desmond, Eileen Barton, and The McGuire Sisters
 Bob Gibson
 Dickie Valentine and Joan Regan

1954 songs
Vocal collaborations
Songs written by Sid Bass (songwriter)
The McGuire Sisters songs